Regina Salmons (born April 21, 1997) is an American rower. She competed in the women's eight event at the 2020 Summer Olympics. She graduated from the University of Pennsylvania in 2018, where she earned honors for her thesis in creative writing and served as editor-in-chief of a feminist literary magazine on campus.

As a collegiate athlete, Salmons was a senior captain and rowed on Penn's Varsity Eight team, which placed third at the 2018 Ivy League Championships. That same year, she earned first-team All Ivy and Collegiate Rowing Coaches Association (CRCA) All-Conference recognition. With US Rowing, she finished fifth at the 2019 World Rowing Cup II, and won gold in the 2018 World Rowing Under 23 Championships in the pair. She also earned gold in the four and eight at the 2016 World Rowing Under 23 Championships.

References

External links
 

1997 births
Living people
American female rowers
Olympic rowers of the United States
Rowers at the 2020 Summer Olympics
Place of birth missing (living people)
21st-century American women